Hunting Time is a 1988 Turkish drama film directed by Erden Kıral about the 1980 Turkish coup d'état. It was entered into the 38th Berlin International Film Festival.

Cast
 Aytaç Arman
 Zihni Küçümen
 Serif Seler

References

External links

1988 films
Films set in Turkey
1980s Turkish-language films
1988 drama films
Films directed by Erden Kıral
Turkish drama films